Juan Francisco de Castro Fernández (25 February 1721– 24 December 1790) was a Spanish priest, lawyer, and writer from Lugo.

References 

Spanish male writers
1721 births
1790 deaths